Sabău is a Romanian-language surname. Notable people with the surname include:

 Antoaneta Sabău (born 1982), Romanian classicist, translator and editor
 Ioan Sabău (born 1968), Romanian footballer and manager
 Radu Sabău (born 1968), Romanian water polo player
 Răzvan Sabău (born 1977), Romanian retired professional tennis player

See also
 Szabó

Romanian-language surnames